Thibaut Monnet (born 2 February 1982) is a Swiss professional ice hockey right winger who currently plays for HC Sierre in the Swiss League (SL).

Monnet began playing professional with HC Martigny of the National League B. He began at the top level with HC La Chaux-de-Fonds in 2000.

Monnet was selected to play for the Swiss national team at the 2010 Winter Olympics. He previously represented Switzerland at the 1999 and 2000 IIHF World U18 Championship, the 2001 and 2002 IIHF World U20 Championships, and the 2007, 2008 and 2009 Ice Hockey World Championships.

Career statistics

Regular season and playoffs

International

External links

1982 births
Living people
HC Ambrì-Piotta players
SC Bern players
HC Fribourg-Gottéron players
EHC Kloten players
HC La Chaux-de-Fonds players
SC Langnau players
Lausanne HC players
HC Martigny players
Olympic ice hockey players of Switzerland
Ice hockey players at the 2010 Winter Olympics
People from Martigny
Swiss ice hockey right wingers
ZSC Lions players
Sportspeople from Valais